General elections were held in Kenya in 1952.

Electoral system
The number of European seats in the Legislative Council was increased from 11 to 14, with two new constituencies in the countryside and one in western Nairobi. The number of Indian seats was increased from five to six, although two seats were allotted to Muslims at their request. All but one of the Indian candidates were running on behalf of the East African Indian National Congress, which supported a boycott of the Council in protest at the division of the Indian seats based on religion. The majority Black population was not entitled to vote, and instead six members (an increase from four) were appointed by the Governor from lists drawn up by local governments following hustings.

Results

Elected members

Aftermath
The newly elected Council convened for the first time on 12 June.

References

1952 elections in Africa
1952 in Kenya
1952
Legislative Council of Kenya